Horseshoe Casino currently known as Binion's Gambling Hall and Hotel, is a casino in downtown Las Vegas. 

Horseshoe Casino may also refer to:

Horseshoe Casino Baltimore in Baltimore, Maryland
Horseshoe Casino Cincinnati, now Hard Rock Casino Cincinnati, in Cincinnati, Ohio
Horseshoe Casino Cleveland in Cleveland, Ohio
Horseshoe Casino Tunica in Tunica Resorts, Mississippi
Horseshoe Bossier City in Bossier City, Louisiana
Horseshoe Council Bluffs in Council Bluffs, Iowa
Horseshoe Hammond in Hammond, Indiana
Horseshoe Las Vegas in Las Vegas, Nevada
Horseshoe Southern Indiana, now Caesars Southern Indiana, in Elizabeth, Indiana
Horseshoe St. Louis in St. Louis, Missouri

See also
Horseshoe Gaming Holding Corporation, a company that developed casinos under the Horseshoe brand